Lespezi is a commune in Iași County, Western Moldavia, Romania. It is composed of six villages: Buda, Bursuc-Deal, Bursuc-Vale, Dumbrava, Heci and Lespezi.

References

Communes in Iași County
Localities in Western Moldavia